The black-throated thrush (Turdus atrogularis) is a passerine bird in the thrush family. It is sometimes regarded as one subspecies of a polytypic species, "dark-throated thrush", red-throated thrush then being the other subspecies. More recent treatments regard the two as separate species.

The black-throated thrush is a migratory Eastern Palearctic species. Its range overlaps with the more easterly-breeding red-throated thrush.

Description
This is a large and distinctive thrush. The male has black from the chin to the breast with a greyish black tail. The upperparts are grey and the underparts are whitish with orange-red underwing coverts. Females and immatures are similar but the black on the throat and breast is replaced with dusky streaking.

Habitat
Black-throated thrushes breed along the edges of clearings in coniferous or mixed deciduous forest, often in the undergrowth of Siberian Pine Pinus sibirica or mixed spruce fir forest, especially along watercourses or in swampy areas.

Ecology
Breeds solitarily or in loose aggregations of pairs in late May through to late July. The nest is made of grasses and thin twigs bound with earth and lined with fine grasses, moss or lichens. The nest is usually placed within 1.5 to 2m of the ground, sometimes on the ground. Otherwise the behaviour is similar to that of the fieldfare T. pilaris. In winter often found in large flocks with other thrushes such as Tickell's thrush T. unicolor, eye-browed thrush T. obscurus and mistle thrush T. viscivorus, on migration often with dusky thrush. Roosts in dense evergreen vegetation. Feeds on the ground on invertebrates and also feeds on various berries, cherries and some seeds.

Distribution
The breeding range of the black-throated thrush extends from the extreme east of Europe to Western Siberia and north-west Mongolia. The wintering range extends from the Middle East, although uncommon in the Arabian Peninsula to eastern Myanmar. As a vagrant it has occurred in Japan, Thailand, and Taiwan as well as to most of Europe west of its normal range.

Taxonomy
The scientific name comes from Latin. Turdus is "thrush" and the specific atrogularis is derived from ater, "black", and gula, "throat". Formerly considered conspecific with the red-throated thrush T. ruficollis but now considered a separate species.

References

black-throated thrush
Birds of Russia
black-throated thrush
black-throated thrush